Zhijian is the Pinyin spelling of a number of different Chinese given names. These names are also spelled Chih-chien in the Wade–Giles romanisation common in Taiwan, and Chi-kin in typical Hong Kong Cantonese spelling (though some names with that spelling would be pronounced Zijian in Mandarin). Some ways of writing this name are listed in the table at right.

People with these names include:

Politics and government
Liu Zhijian (刘志坚, 1912–2006), People's Liberation Army general
Zhang Zhijian (张志坚, born 1934), People's Liberation Army general
Bai Zhijian (白志健, born 1948), director of the Liaison Office of the Central People's Government in the Macau Special Administrative Region
Fung Chi-kin (馮志堅, born 1949), former Hong Kong Legislative Councilmember
Kwong Chi-kin (鄺志堅, born 1958), Hong Kong Federation of Trade Unions politician
Lin Chih-chien (林智堅, born 1975), Taiwanese politician, mayor of Hsinchu City

Sport
Tam Chi Kin (譚智健, born 1980), Hong Kong swimmer
Chao Chih-chien (趙志堅, born 1983), Taiwanese track and field athlete
Zhi-Gin Lam (林志堅, born 1991), Hong Kong football player 
Lee Chi Kin (李志堅), Hong Kong football manager

Other
Xuedou Zhijian (雪窦智鑑, 1105–1192), Song Dynasty Buddhist monk
Li Zhijian (李志坚, born 1928), microelectronics pioneer at Tsinghua University
Larry Yung Chi-kin (榮智健, born 1942), former chairman of CITIC Pacific
Guo Zhijian (郭志坚, born 1971), China Central Television news anchor 
Sammy Leung Chi-kin (梁志健, born 1973), disc jockey for Hong Kong Commercial Radio 
Zhijian James Chen (陈志坚), professor of biochemistry at the University of Texas Southwestern Medical Center

See also
Ellesmere Choi (蔡子健, born 1969), Hong Kong television actor
Chui Chi-kin (徐子見), Hong Kong politician (Eastern District Council)
Derek Kwok (郭子健), Hong Kong film director

Chinese masculine given names